Ma Sim Pai is a village in Tsuen Wan District, Hong Kong.

External links
 Delineation of area of existing village Ma Sim Pai (Tsuen Wan) for election of resident representative (2019 to 2022)

Villages in Tsuen Wan District, Hong Kong
Tsuen Wan District